Mannequin Pussy is an American punk and indie rock band from Philadelphia. They have released three albums; Mannequin Pussy (2014) and Romantic (2016) on Tiny Engines, and Patience (2019) on Epitaph Records. Their recent EP, Perfect, was released in 2021 to favorable reviews.

History

2010–2015: Early career and Gypsy Pervert/Mannequin Pussy
Mannequin Pussy was formed in October 2010 by friends Marisa "Missy" Dabice and Athanasios Paul, who met when they went to school together. The band was initially a two-piece, with Dabice as the guitarist/singer and Paul as the drummer. In 2011, they released two EPs, titled Bonerjamz! and Meatslave. One of their songs, "Clue Juice", appears on "Leisure Rules", a cassette-only compilation released in July 2012 on the Reeks Of Effort label on Bandcamp. In the same month, thirteen of their songs were released on one side of a split tour cassette called "Banditos", with Idaho band Art Fad on the Trash Palace Tapes label.

At the beginning of 2013, Drew Adler joined the band as a drummer and Paul moved to guitar. Their first full-length album, Gypsy Pervert was released in October 2013, as a limited edition, cassette-only release on the Rarebit Records label. In November 2013, one of their songs appeared on The Le Sigh Vol. 1 Compilation.

In 2014, Mannequin Pussy signed with Tiny Engines. That same year, Mannequin Pussy re-released their debut album on the label titled Gypsy Pervert. It was later renamed to the self-titled Mannequin Pussy after the band regretted the use of the word "gypsy", which is often used as pejorative against Romani people.

2015–2021: Romantic and Patience

In 2015, Kaleen Reading joined the band as drummer, replacing Drew Adler. In 2016, bassist, Colins "Bear" Regisford joined the line-up as a bassist. Mannequin Pussy released their second full-length album on Tiny Engines titled Romantic on October 28, 2016. The album's title track was ranked number 14 on Rolling Stone magazine's 50 Best Songs of 2016 list. On May 30, 2017, Mannequin Pussy released a music video for the song "Pledge" on their YouTube channel. Dabice told DIY: "So many times in our life we find ourselves being influenced from the outside. People try to control us - our beliefs, our movements, our identities, our dress…; The video for Pledge sought to narrate a woman’s experience where her movements are controlled by a man, by the others who surround her and the powerful declaration that she is able to make to herself when she can free herself of the people who seek to conform her." In June 2017, Mannequin Pussy embarked on a European tour, followed by shows in the United States from July to September.

In 2019, Mannequin Pussy announced they had signed with Epitaph Records. On April 24, they released the single "Drunk II" and announced their third album, Patience. The video for "Drunk II", directed by Dabice, depicts her falling in love with three different people at a bar. Leading up to the release of the album, Mannequin Pussy released the singles "Who You Are" on May 20 and "Cream" on June 17. The music video for "Cream", directed by Hanna Hamilton, takes inspiration from '70s horror movies. Patience was released on June 21, 2019. Dabice has described the album as being about un-learning self-hatred, practicing self-love, and being patient with yourself and others.

In March 2020, Mannequin Pussy was forced to cancel or postpone tour dates due to the COVID-19 pandemic. On March 2, 2021, Dabice appeared as an FBI agent in the music video for "Be Sweet" by Japanese Breakfast.

2021–present: Perfect

On March 18, it was announced that Paul had left to "begin a new chapter in his life" and the band would continue as a three-piece group. On March 23, Mannequin Pussy announced an EP, titled Perfect, and released its first single, "Control". A second single, the title track "Perfect", was released on April 26, 2021.

Two Mannequin Pussy songs, "Who You Are" and "In Love Again", were performed in the 2021 HBO miniseries Mare of Easttown by the fictional band Androgynous.

The Perfect EP was released on May 21, 2021. The majority of the EP was written in the studio since the band members were continuing to self-isolate due to the pandemic. One of its songs, "Pigs is Pigs", is the first Mannequin Pussy song to feature Regisford singing lead vocals. Pitchfork's Arielle Gordon gave the EP a 7.2 out of 10, and noted "Perfect continues the sophistication of its immediate predecessor while introducing subtle shifts in sound and structure".

On Saturday, October 30 the band members awoke to find that someone had stolen their 2012 Econoline touring van with attached U-Haul trailer, containing over $50,000 worth of equipment. Their tour continued with borrowed equipment from other bands.

Band members

Current members
 Marisa "Missy" Dabice – lead vocals, guitar (2010–present), keyboards, bass (2021–present)
 Kaleen Reading – drums (2015–present)
 Colins "Bear" Regisford – bass (2016–present), backing vocals (2019–present), lead vocals (2021–present)

Former members
 Drew Adler – drums (2013-2015)
 Athanasios Paul – drums (2010–2013), guitar (2013–2021), keyboards (2019-2021)

Timeline

Discography

Studio albums

Extended plays

References

External links
 Mannequin Pussy on Bandcamp

American rock music groups
Musical groups from Philadelphia
Punk rock groups from Pennsylvania
2010 establishments in Pennsylvania
Musical groups established in 2010
Tiny Engines artists